Wendy Holden (born 12 June 1965) is a best-selling British novelist.

Holden was born and raised in Cleckheaton, West Riding of Yorkshire. She attended Whitcliffe Mount School,  and read English at Girton College, Cambridge, graduating from Cambridge University in the mid-1980s. Holden moved to London where she found work in the magazine business, eventually working for The Diplomat monthly, where she became an editor. From there, she moved on to The Sunday Times. One of her responsibilities at the title was ghostwriting a column on behalf of socialite Tara Palmer-Tomkinson, an experience which Holden says influenced her first novel, Simply Divine.

Simply Divine was published in 1999, and Holden went on to write a series of novels, most of which were bestsellers, and which she happily describes as "chick lit" and "supermarket novels". After over a decade focused on the genre, Holden turned her attention to historical fiction. Her first novel in the genre, The Governess, told the story of Marion Crawford, governess to the future Queen Elizabeth II. Her subsequent novel, The Duchess, released in 2021, focused on the life of Wallis Simpson.

 Holden is married, has two children, and lives in the Derbyshire Peak District.

Publications
 Simply Divine
 Bad Heir Day
 Pastures Nouveaux
 Fame Fatale
 Azur Like It
 The Wives of Bath
 The School for Husbands
 Filthy Rich
 Beautiful People
 Gallery Girl
 Marrying Up
 Gifted and Talented
 Wild and Free
 The Honeymoon Suite
 The Hipster Weddings
 Last of the Summer Moet
 A View to a Kilt
 The Governess
 The Duchess

References

External links

1965 births
Living people
People from Cleckheaton
British chick lit writers
English novelists
English women novelists
Ghostwriters